The World Taekwondo Grand Prix is a taekwondo competition introduced by the World Taekwondo Federation in 2013 to provide a homogeneous system for qualification to the Olympic taekwondo tournament. It consists of four competitions per year in each Olympic weight category event. Olympic events occur at approximately half the weight classes as WTF-organised tournaments.

Venues

The most common format of the event has been a series of three Grand Prix, followed by a Grand Final. The first Grand Prix in 2013, and the event in 2016, were single leg competitions, while the 2018 edition had a 4th Grand Prix leg before the Grand Final. The original Grand Prix was held in Manchester, England, recognising the sport's popularity in the United Kingdom, and Manchester remains the most visited venue, with 5 Grand Prix events, while the United Kingdom is also the most visited country, with six events. Russia, Mexico and Italy have also hosted multiple legs.

The 2020 event was to be a single event in Cancún, but was cancelled due to the Covid pandemic, while the 2021 event was abandoned for the same reason, without being officially arranged. The event returned in Rome for an eighth season in 2022.

All-time medal table

All-time medal count as World Taekwondo Grand Prix Final Riyadh 2022

Multiple gold medalists
The table shows those who have won at least three gold medals. As of Riyadh 2022

Men

Women

See also
World Taekwondo Championships
World Cup Taekwondo Team Championships

References
Official website

External links
World Taekwondo Federation

 
GP
World Taekwondo Grand Prix